The qualification for the 2005 CONCACAF U-17 Tournament took place between July and December 2004.

Caribbean Zone

Preliminary round

First round

Group A

Group B

Group C

Group D

Second round

First legs

Second legs

Central American Zone

Triangular 1

Hosted in San Salvador, El Salvador.

Triangular 2

Hosted in Tegucigalpa, Honduras

References 

2005 CONCACAF U17 Tournament
CONCACAF U-17 Championship qualification